Nguyễn Văn Minh (born 8 February 1999) is a Vietnamese professional football player who plays as a winger for Hà Nội in V.League 1

Honours
Hà Nội
Vietnamese Super Cup: 2021

References

External links

1999 births
Living people
Vietnamese footballers
Vietnam international footballers
Association football forwards
V.League 1 players